In plasma physics, a drift wave  is a type of collective excitation that is driven by a pressure gradient within a magnetised plasma, which can be destabilised by differences between ion and electron motion (then known as drift-wave instability or drift instability). The drift wave typically propagates across the pressure gradient and is perpendicular to the magnetic field. It can occur in relatively simple configurations such as in a column of plasma with a non-uniform density but a straight magnetic field. Drift wave turbulence is responsible for the transport of particles, energy and momentum across magnetic field lines.

The characteristic frequency associated with drift waves involving electron flow is given by

References 

Plasma physics